Melvin Allan "Mel" Goodman is a national security and intelligence expert. He has worked as an analyst for the Central Intelligence Agency (CIA) and the State Department, taught at the National War College and Johns Hopkins University, and is a senior fellow at the Center for International Policy.

Career
Goodman's career in intelligence began in the U.S. Army where he worked as cryptographer. He then worked as an analyst at the Central Intelligence Agency, from 1966 to 1974. He transferred to the Bureau of Intelligence and Research in 1974, where he spent the next two years working as a senior analyst. He returned to the Central Intelligence Agency in 1976, and served as the division chief and senior analyst at the Office of Soviet Affairs until leaving in 1986.

He also served as an intelligence adviser to the Strategic Arms Limitation Talks.

He went on to teach at the National War College as a professor of international security, from 1986 through 2004. He is currently an adjunct professor at Johns Hopkins University, and a senior fellow at the Center for International Policy.

Works
 
 
 
 
 
  
 Whistleblower at the CIA. An Insiders Account of the Politics of Intelligence. City Lights Books. 2016.

References

External links
 
 
 
 
 
 
 
 

Johns Hopkins University faculty
National War College faculty
Analysts of the Central Intelligence Agency
United States Department of State officials
Living people
American political writers
American foreign policy writers
American male non-fiction writers
American military writers
Year of birth missing (living people)